Carla Maria Proença de Castro Charters de Azevedo (born 6 April 1978) is a Portuguese businesswoman, professor and politician. She is an MP of Liberal Initiative, who also serves as the vice-president of the party's parliamentary group. She was elected to the Assembly of the Republic, for the Lisbon District, in March 2022. She is currently part of the party's executive commission and running for President of Liberal Initiative.

Politics 

She is a member of the executive committee of the Liberal Initiative, acting as a member. In the 2022 Portuguese legislative election, she was elected deputy in the Assembly of the Republic for the Lisbon constituency, having previously been advisor to the office of the sole deputy João Cotrim de Figueiredo since October 2019 and coordinator of the Liberal Initiative studies office.

See also
Liberalism in Portugal

References

External links
Carla Castro at Assembly of the Republic (in Portuguese)

1978 births
Living people
20th-century Portuguese economists
Businesspeople from Lisbon
Members of the Assembly of the Republic (Portugal)
Liberal Initiative people
21st-century Portuguese economists